Russell Lee Morman (born April 28, 1962) is an American professional baseball coach, manager, and former Major League Baseball (MLB) first baseman/outfielder who played for the Chicago White Sox, Kansas City Royals, and Florida Marlins between  and .

Playing career
A native of Independence, Missouri, Morman played college baseball at Iowa Western Community College and Wichita State University. In 1982, he played collegiate summer baseball with the Orleans Cardinals of the Cape Cod Baseball League. He was selected by the White Sox in the first round of the 1983 MLB Draft.

Coaching career
After his playing career ended, Morman managed in the Marlin and Boston Red Sox farm systems and served as a hitting coach for the Portland Sea Dogs and Pawtucket Red Sox through the  season.

He was the hitting coach of the Richmond Flying Squirrels of the Eastern League and Double-A affiliate of the San Francisco Giants, in 2010. In 2011, he became the hitting coach for the Fresno Grizzlies of the Pacific Coast League, then the Giants' Triple-A affiliate.

His career minor-league managerial record is 290–265 (.523) over four seasons.

Personal life
In 2005, Morman was inducted into the Kansas City Sports Commission Hall of Fame.

References

External links

1962 births
Living people
All-American college baseball players
American expatriate baseball players in Canada
Appleton Foxes players
Baseball coaches from Missouri
Baseball players from Missouri
Buffalo Bisons (minor league) players
Calgary Cannons players
Charlotte Knights players
Chicago White Sox players
Durham Bulls players
Edmonton Trappers players
Florida Marlins players
Glens Falls White Sox players
Hawaii Islanders players
Iowa Western Reivers baseball players
Kansas City Royals players
Major League Baseball first basemen
Major League Baseball outfielders
Minor league baseball managers
Nashville Sounds players
Omaha Royals players
Orleans Firebirds players
Sportspeople from Independence, Missouri
Vancouver Canadians players
Wichita State Shockers baseball players